Crystal Stilts is an American post-punk band from Brooklyn, New York City, though their founding members, Brad Hargett and JB Townsend, were originally from Florida.

History
Crystal Stilts was formed in 2003 by Brad Hargett and JB Townsend. After releasing one single and an EP, the pair expanded to five members before signing to Slumberland Records in the US and Angular Recording Corporation in Europe and releasing their debut, Alight of Night, in 2008. The band played the Pitchfork stage at the 2009 Primavera Sound festival in Barcelona. After a few bouts of touring and some down-time, the band returned in 2011 with the LP In Love With Oblivion, in April 2011 and the Radiant Door EP in November 2011. In 2013 they released their third album, Nature Noir, "expanding their sound to incorporate elements of soul, country, and folk." The group currently resides in Brooklyn, New York.

Members
Brad Hargett – vocals
JB Townsend – guitar
Kyle Forester – keyboards
Andy Adler – bass
Keegan Cooke – drums

Discography

Studio albums
Alight of Night (Slumberland Records, 2008 and Angular Recording Corporation, 2009)
In Love with Oblivion (Fortuna Pop! (UK) and Slumberland Records (US), 2011)
Nature Noir (Sacred Bones, 2013)

Singles
"Shattered Shine" b/w "lights" 7" (Feathery Tongue, 2004)
"Departure" 7" (Angular Recording Corporation, 2009)
"Love Is a Wave" b/w "Sugarbaby" 7" (Slumberland Records and Angular Recording Corporation, 2009)
"Shake the Shackles" 7" (Slumberland Records, 2010)
"Precarious Stair" b/w "Temptation Inside Of Your Heart" (Little Teddy Recordings, 2011)
"Through the Floor" 7" (Slumberland Records, 2011)

EPs
EP (Feathery Tongue, 2005)
Crystal Stilts EP (Woodsist, re-press 2008)
Radiant Door EP (Sacred Bones, 2011)

References
Notes

Further reading
Pitchfork, "Pitchfork Media"
Crystal Stilts, The Guardian
Crystal Stilts live review at Leeds Brudenell Social Club

External links
 

Garage rock groups from New York (state)
Dream pop musical groups
Garage punk groups
Indie rock musical groups from California
Jangle pop groups
Musical groups from New York City
Noise pop musical groups
Sacred Bones Records artists